Samuel Koeberle (born 26 November 2004) is a French professional footballer who plays as a midfielder for the French club Reims.

Club career
Koeberle is a youth product of the academy of Stade de Reims, and was promoted to their reserves for the 2021-22 season. He made his professional debut with the senior Reims team in a 2–1 Ligue 1 win over FC Lorient on 1 May 2022.

International career
Koeberle is a youth international for France, having been called up to the France U18s in 2021.

Personal life
Koeberle's father, Patrick, was also a professional footballer who also played for Reims.

References

External links
 
 FFF Profile

2004 births
Living people
Sportspeople from Reims
French footballers
France youth international footballers
Association football midfielders
Stade de Reims players
Ligue 1 players
Championnat National 2 players
Footballers from Grand Est